Santiago González and Scott Lipsky were the defending champions but decided to compete in the 2013 BNP Paribas Open instead.
Jürgen Melzer and Philipp Petzschner defeated Eric Butorac and Dominic Inglot 6–3, 6–1 in the final to win the title.

Seeds

Draw

Draw

References
 Main Draw

Dallas Tennis Classic - Doubles
2013 Doubles